Light River may refer to:

 Light River (South Australia), a river across the Adelaide Plains
 Light River (New Zealand) in Fiordland

See also 
 Strike-a-Light River
 Light (disambiguation)